Great Ashfield Castle, also known locally as Castle Hill, is a medieval motte and bailey castle near the village of Great Ashfield, Suffolk, England.

Details

Great Ashfield Castle is a Norman motte and bailey castle near the village of Great Ashfield in Suffolk. the motte is 130 feet in diameter at the base and 24 feet high. The motte is surrounded by a fosse, 18 feet wide and 7 feet wide, which some investigations have suggested is a later edition to the castle.

Today the castle is a scheduled monument.

See also
Castles in Great Britain and Ireland
List of castles in England

References

Bibliography
Page, William. (ed) (1911) The Victoria History of Suffolk, Vol. 1. London: University of London.
Wall, J. C. (1911) "Ancient Earthworks," in Page (ed) (1911).

Castles in Suffolk